Aetheibidion hirtellum is a species of longhorn beetle in the Elaphidiini subfamily, and is the only species in the genus Aetheibidion.

References

External links
 

Elaphidiini
Beetles described in 1913